Empress Mother Thượng Dương (? – died 1073) was a regent of the Lý dynasty during the minority of her stepson in 1072–1073.

Biography
Thượng Dương was the empress of Lý Thánh Tông. Her family name was Dương (楊).

When emperor Lý Thánh Tông died in 1072 she and thái sư (chancellor) Lý Đạo Thành were appointed regents for 7-year-old son Lý Nhân Tông, the son born to Lý Thánh Tông by his concubine, the second queen Ỷ Lan. Ỷ Lan arranged the death of Thượng Dương and her servants the following year and Lý Đạo Thành was temporarily banished to the provinces.

References

1073 deaths
Lý dynasty empresses dowager
11th-century women rulers
11th-century Vietnamese women
Lý dynasty empresses